Wildwood is an unincorporated village in Hampton Township, Allegheny County, Pennsylvania, United States.

References

Unincorporated communities in Allegheny County, Pennsylvania
Unincorporated communities in Pennsylvania